Mike McClure (born July 6, 1971) is an American singer, songwriter, and producer from Tecumseh, Oklahoma. He is currently the frontman for the Mike McClure Band. McClure is a founding member of The Great Divide, and was a member until he and the band parted ways in 2002. The Mike McClure Band consists of McClure (guitar, vocals), and Caleb Shirtum (bass).

McClure got his start in Stillwater, Oklahoma, and would hang out and play music at the notorious "Farm" with other Red Dirt artists such as Bob Childers, Tom Skinner, and Scott Evans. After forming The Great Divide with J.J. Lester, Scotte Lester, and Kelley Green in 1992 and contributing to six studio albums and one live two-part album, McClure set out to do his own thing.

In 2002, while still a member of The Great Divide, he released Twelve Pieces, his first solo album. First there was Les Paul Clanton on bass and Rodney Pyeatt on guitar. Both went to do other projects. After recruiting Tom Skinner (bass) and Eric Hansen (drums), McClure had his band together. In 2004, The Mike McClure Band released their first album Everything Upside Down, a hard-hitting rock album. McClure often uses the quote that his new band is "twice as loud, and half as popular." Since the first album, the band has put out seven more albums, including the 2004 collaboration with the Burtschi Brothers of Norman, Oklahoma.  After the death of Tom Skinner in July 2015 and the departure of Hansen, the band took on its current look.

As a songwriter and producer, McClure has collaborated with many other Red Dirt artists. He has become the permanent producer for Cross Canadian Ragweed. Usually contributing also as a songwriter, he has produced five of their seven studio albums, jokingly earning him the title of "prodouchebag." McClure has also produced albums by other artists around the scene such as Stoney LaRue, Jason Boland & the Stragglers, Scott Copeland, Johnny Cooper, Whiskey Myers, and the Turnpike Troubadours.

In 2011 McClure Produced and Recorded with  The Damn Quails, releasing "Down the Hatch"  in October 2011.

In 2014, McClure produced and recorded The Chris Brazeal Band, releasing their 3rd album "A Heart Like Yours" in September 2014. He appears on their cover of Hal Ketchum's "Small Town Saturday Night"

On February 27, 2022 he was inducted into the Oklahoma Music Hall of Fame.

Discography

Music videos

Notable appearances

"I'd Rather Have Nothing", written by McClure and originally recorded by The Great Divide
was recorded by Garth Brooks for his 2005 Limited Series Box Set on the album The Lost Sessions.
It has sold over 2 million copies.

"Fighting For", written by McClure and Cody Canada reached number 39 on the Billboard Hot Country Songs chart. It
was recorded by Cross Canadian Ragweed for their album Garage.

McClure has been working with Joe Hardy since "Foam".

Reunited with all original members of The Great Divide in August 2011 for a reunion concert in Stillwater, Oklahoma. The band 
plans to tour lightly throughout 2012.

References

External links
 Band website

1971 births
Living people
American country rock singers
21st-century American singers